Udita Goswami (born 9 February 1984) is a former Indian actress who worked in Hindi cinema. She has been married to film director Mohit Suri since 2013. She is Sister in law of Bollywood Celebrities Alia Bhatt and Emraan Hashmi.

Personal life
Goswami was born in Dehradun. Her father is from Banaras and her mother is from Shillong. Goswami's grandmother is Nepalese. She completed her education in Dehradun where she studied at Cambrian Hall and D.A.V. Public school until class 9.

After a few years of dating, Goswami married Mohit Suri in 2013. They have two children, a daughter born in 2015 and a son born in 2018. She is the sister-in-law of actors Pooja Bhatt, Alia Bhatt and Emraan Hashmi.

Career
Goswami started her career as a model and later began acting in Hindi films.

She worked as a model for brands like Pepsi, Titan Watches and debuted in Bollywood opposite John Abraham with Paap, which was also Pooja Bhatt's directorial debut. She later starred in Zeher opposite her Brother in law  Emraan Hashmi and Aksar opposite Dino Morea. She also appeared with Upen Patel in Ahmed Khan's music video for the remix of Kya Khoob Lagti Ho.

In 2012, she played the lead role in Diary of a Butterfly directed by Vinodh Mukhi which released to unfavorable reviews

Filmography

References

External links

 
 

1984 births
Living people
Indian film actresses
Indian people of Nepalese descent
Actresses in Hindi cinema
21st-century Indian actresses
Actresses from Uttarakhand